Dubai Channel 33 (originally branded as Ch33) was a national television channel transmitting terrestrially out of Dubai in English, targeting the expat community in the U.A.E. It was founded in 1977. Up until the late 1980s, it was a 12-hour channel, switching broadcasts adjacently from one of Emirates Dubai Television's frequencies starting at 2:00 pm, U.A.E. time, with a children's block, and concluding at 2:00 am. The times of the switch often changed usually during Ramadan, which varied each year. It was the only free-to-air English-language channel in Dubai at the time.

From the late 1990s, its popularity started dwindling due to availability of alternate channels in English as well as the expat communities native languages via growing use of satellite TV and mainstream cable (E-Vision in 2000).

In 2002, it started transmitting over the satellite using Arabsat and Nilesat, and turned into a free-to-air 24-hour channel, even though retaining the children's block timing at 2:00 pm.

In 2004, it changed its identity completely and relaunched as Dubai One (after being known as One TV for a short initial period) and is now part of Dubai Media Incorporated. Dubai One managed to recapture some of the lost expat market due to its more U.S.-based premium programming, even though when it was temporarily known as "One TV", it retained most of Ch33's original programming, including the signature children's block, which was later removed. However, Ch33 had an originality that could never be replaced and is now being copied by other Gulf states expat televisions.

Ch33 originally had a habit of changing the type-face of their logo every few years.

It originally aired popular and latest US TV Shows, UK Comedy, Horse Racing, daily News and every Thursday 10.00pm, a Hindi movie subtitled in English. Later, its programs became even more diversified to include more soaps from Australia, Canada, etc.

The Hindi film ceremony Zee Cine Awards was also shown in February 2004, which took place in Dubai.

As with other media in the UAE, all programs on Channel 33 were to be aired after heavy and inconsistent censoring of whatever content was deemed inappropriate by its censor boards. The channel only allowed Islamic shows and no other religious shows were permitted.

Channel 33 had a teletext service called GULFAX.

Former Programming

Action
 18 Wheels of Justice
 The Adventures of Sinbad
 Airwolf
 The A-Team
 Bring 'Em Back Alive
 Cagney & Lacey
 Cleopatra 2525
 Cobra
 CHiPS
 The Fall Guy
 The Flash
 Hercules: The Legendary Journeys
 Highlander: The Series
 Jack of All Trades
 Knight Rider
 Kung Fu
 Kung Fu: The Legend Continues
 MacGyver
 Magnum, P.I.
 Manimal
 Miami Vice
 McClain's Law
 Nasty Boys
 The Old Fox
 The Pretender
 Quantum Leap
 Remington Steele
 Renegade
 Scarecrow and Mrs. King
 Six Million Dollar Man
 Sliders
 Street Hawk
 S.W.A.T.
 Team Knight Rider
 T.J. Hooker
 Walker, Texas Ranger
 Zorro

Animated shows
 101 Dalmatians: The Series
 2 Stupid Dogs
 64 Zoo Lane
 Ace Ventura: Pet Detective
 The Adventures of Alix
 The Adventures of Blinky Bill
 The Adventures of Gulliver
 The Adventures of Marco and Gina
 The Adventures of Paddington Bear
 Adventures of Sonic the Hedgehog
 The Adventures of Super Mario Bros. 3
 The Adventures of Teddy Ruxpin
 The Adventures of Tintin
 Aladdin
 Alfred J. Kwak
 ALF: The Animated Series
 The Amazing Adventures of Morph
 Andy Panda
 Andy Pandy
 Animal Crackers
 Animal Shelf
 Animaniacs
 Anne of Green Gables
 Arthur
 Avenger Penguins
 The Avengers: United They Stand
 Babar
 The Baby Huey Show
 Bad Dog
 Barbapapa
 Batman: The Animated Series
 Beany and Cecil
 Beethoven
 Beetlejuice
 Biker Mice from Mars
 Billy the Cat
 Bill and Ben
 Bimble's Bucket
 Bingo and Molly
 Binka
 Bionic Six
 BlackStar
 Blazing Dragons
 Bob Morane
 Bob the Builder
 Bonkers
 The Brothers Flub
 The Bubblies
 Bucky O'Hare and the Toad Wars
 Budgie the Little Helicopter
 The Busy World of Richard Scarry
 Captain Planet and the Planeteers
 Care Bears
 Carrot Top
 Cédric
 The Centurions
 Challenge of the GoBots
 Channel Umptee-3
 Chilly Willy
 Chip 'n Dale Rescue Rangers
 Cone Control
 Count Duckula
 Creepy Crawlies
 Cro
 Danger Mouse
 Defenders of the Earth
 Delook and Sharpy
 Dennis the Menace
 Dennis the Menace and Gnasher
 Denver, the Last Dinosaur
 Dink, the Little Dinosaur
 Dinosaucers
 Dog City
 Dr Otter
 Dragon Tales
 DragonFlyz
 The Dreamstone
 Dr. Zitbag's Transylvania Pet Shop
 DuckTales
 Dungeons & Dragons
 Earthworm Jim
 Eckhart
 Elliot Moose
 ExoSquad
 Fables of the Green Forest
 Family Dog
 Fantastic Four
 Fantomcat
 Fat Albert and the Cosby Kids
 Fat Dog Mendoza
 Felix the Cat
 Ferdy the Ant
 Fireman Sam
 Fix and Foxi
 The Flintstones
 The Flying House
 Flying Rhino Junior High
 Foofur
 Free Willy
 Funny Little Bugs
 Futurama
 Gadget Boy & Heather
 Galtar and the Golden Lance
 George Shrinks
 The Get Along Gang
 Go Go Gophers
 Godzilla: The Series
 Goof Troop
 Gummi Bears
 G.I. Joe: A Real American Hero
 Hammerman
 He-Man and the Masters of the Universe
 Hocus and Lotus
 The Hot Rod Dogs and Cool Car Cats
 The Incredible Hulk
 Inspector Gadget
 Iron Man
 It's Punky Brewster!
 The Jetsons
 Jumanji
 Jym and Jam
 Kampung Boy
 The Karate Kid
 Kimba the White Lion
 Kipper
 The Legend of Calamity Jane
 The Legends of Treasure Island
 Little Bear
 The Magic Ball
 The Magician
 Maisy
 The Marvel Super Heroes
 The Mask: The Animated Series
 Maya the Bee
 Mighty Ducks
 Monchhichis
 Monster Force
 The Moomins
 Mortal Kombat: Defenders of the Realm
 Mother Goose and Grimm
 The Mozart Band
 Mr. Bogus
 Mr. Hiccup
 Mr. Men Show
 Mummies Alive!
 Muppet Babies
 My Little Pony
 My Little Pony Tales
 M.A.S.K.
 Ned's Newt
 The Neverending Story
 The New Adventures of Winnie the Pooh
 The New Fantastic Four
 Noah's Island
 Noddy's Toyland Adventures
 Norman Normal
 Oakie Doke
 Oggy and the Cockroaches
 Oscar's Orchestra
 Paw Paws
 Percy the Park Keeper
 Pigeon Street
 Pim Wright
 Pingu
 The Pink Panther
 Pippi Longstocking
 Pokémon
 Pole Position
 Police Academy
 Popeye and Son
 Popeye the Sailor
 Popples
 Princess Sissi
 Problem Child
 Prudence Petitpas
 The Raggy Dolls
 Rainbow Fish
 Rambo: The Force of Freedom
 The Real Ghostbusters
 ReBoot
 Redwall
 The Ren & Stimpy Show
 Ripley's Believe It or Not!
 Road Rovers
 The Road Runner Show
 Robinson Sucroe
 Rocko's Modern Life
 The Rocky and Bullwinkle Show
 Roger Ramjet
 Rotten Ralph
 Rude Dog and the Dweebs
 Rupert
 Saber Rider and the Star Sheriffs
 Sagwa, the Chinese Siamese Cat
 Sandokan
 Savage Dragon
 Sharky and George
 Sheeep
 Sheherazade
 Simsala Grimm
 The Simpsons
 Sky Commanders
 South Park
 Space Goofs
 Spider-Man and His Amazing Friends
 The Spooktacular New Adventures of Casper
 Spunky and Tadpole
 Stone Protectors
 Street Sharks
 Stunt Dawgs
 The Super Mario Bros. Super Show!
 Super Mario World
 Superman: The Animated Series
 SuperTed
 SWAT Kats: The Radical Squadron
 The Sylvester & Tweety Mysteries
 Tales of the Tooth Fairies
 Taz-Mania
 Teenage Mutant Ninja Turtles
 Timbuctoo
 Timon & Pumbaa
 Timothy Goes to School
 Tiny Toon Adventures
 Titch
 Toad Patrol
 Tom & Jerry
 Tom & Jerry Kids
 Toonimals!
 The Toothbrush Family
 The Transformers
 The Treacle People
 Turbo Teen
 Underdog
 The Undersea Adventures of Captain Nemo
 The Untouchables of Elliot Mouse
 Victor and Hugo
 Voltron: The Third Dimension
 Vor-Tech: Undercover Conversion Squad
 Waldo's Way
 Wazoo!
 The Wheels on the Bus
 Where on Earth Is Carmen Sandiego?
 Widget, the World Watcher
 Wild West C.O.W.-Boys of Moo Mesa
 Will Quack Quack 
 Wisdom of the Gnomes
 Wish Kid
 Wizard Tales
 Where's Wally?
 Woody Woodpecker
 The Wuzzles
 Yoho Ahoy
 Yo Yogi!

Children's Programmes
 100 Deeds for Eddie McDowd
 2030 CE
 3-2-1 Contact
 Adventures in Wonderland
 Adventures of the AfterMath Crew
 Amazing Animal Videos
 Are You Afraid of the Dark?
 Art Attack
 Back to Sherwood
 Barney & Friends
 Beakman's World
 Between the Lions
 Bill Nye the Science Guy
 Bits and Pieces
 Brill
 Brum
 Caitlin's Way
 Captain Abercromby
 Chicken Dreams
 Children of the New Forest
 Children's Island
 Critter Gitters
 Dog and Duck
 Doodle
 Dynamic Six
 Dynamo Duck
 The Electric Company
 Elmo's World
 Eugénie Sandler P.I.
 Fraggle Rock
 Ghostwriter
 The Great Space Coaster
 Groundling Marsh
 Guess What?
 Horace and Tina
 Horse Tales
 Jay Jay the Jet Plane 
 Kids Incorporated
 Kidsongs
 Kratts' Creatures
 Lamb Chop's Play-Along
 The Legend of William Tell
 Let's Read... With Basil Brush
 Little Star
 Mentors
 The Mickey Mouse Club
 Mowgli: The New Adventures of the Jungle Book
 My Secret Identity
 MythQuest
 Nanalan'
 Nini's Treehouse
 Noddy
 Ocean Girl
 Oscar Charlie
 Pinocchio
 Polka Dot Shorts
 Power Rangers
 Pumuckl
 The Puzzle Place
 Ramona
 Real Kids, Real Adventures
 Road to Avonlea
 Scene
 Sesame Street
 Size Small
 Skippy the Bush Kangaroo
 Space Cases
 Spellbinder
 Square One Television
 Sunshine Factory
 Super Gran
 Teletubbies
 Theodore Tugboat
 Thunderstone
 Tidbits for Toddlers
 Tots TV
 Tweenies
 T-Bag
 Whizziwig
 Wimzie's House
 Wishbone
 World's Greatest Pets
 Young Hercules
 Zoo Family

Comedy
 'Allo 'Allo
 America's Funniest Home Videos
 Benson
 The Beverly Hillbillies
 Boy Meets World
 Brotherly Love
 The Carol Burnett Show
 Charles In Charge
 City Guys
 Cosby
 Dad's Army
 Dave's World
 Dharma & Greg
 Diff'rent Strokes
 Dinosaurs
 The Doris Day Show
 Empty Nest
 Everybody Loves Raymond
 Fawlty Towers
 The Fresh Prince of Bel-Air
 Friends
 Fudge
 Futurama
 Get a Life
 Gilligan's Island
 The Golden Girls
 Good Advice
 The Gregory Hines Show
 Guys Like Us
 Half & Half
 Happy Days
 Harry and the Hendersons
 Head of the Class
 Here and Now
 Hey Dad..!
 Home Improvement
 Home James!
 Honey, I Shrunk the Kids: The TV Show
 The Jeffersons
 Jesse
 Just for Laughs
 Keeping Up Appearances
 The King of Kensington
 The King of Queens
 Ladies Man
 Lame Ducks
 L.A. Doctors
 Major Dad
 Malcolm & Eddie
 Maude
 Me and the Chimp
 Mind Your Language
 Mr. Bean
 The Muppet Show
 My Family
 Never the Twain
 Night Court
 Out of This World
 The Parent 'Hood
 Police Academy: The Series
 Rumpole of the Bailey
 Sanford and Son
 Saved by the Bell
 Seinfeld
 The Simpsons
 The Sinbad Show
 Small Wonder
 Smart Guy
 Spin City
 Starting from Scratch
 The Steve Harvey Show
 Suddenly Susan
 Thirtysomething
 USA High
 The Wonder Years

Drama
 18 Wheels of Justice
 21 Jump Street
 Amazon
 The Associates
 Automan
 Beauty and the Beast
 Beverly Hills, 90210
 Blue Heelers
 Buck Rogers in the 25th Century
 Code Red
 The Cowboys
 Dangerous Minds
 Doctor Who
 Doogie Howser, M.D.
 Dr. Quinn, Medicine Woman
 Due South
 Early Edition
 Earth: Final Conflict
 Eight is Enough
 ER
 Fame
 Fantasy Island
 Farscape
 Father Murphy
 Felicity
 Harbour Lights
 Hart to Hart
 Here's Boomer
 The Hitchhiker's Guide to the Galaxy
 The Inspector Lynley Mysteries
 Investigations of the Lost Frontiers
 Judging Amy
 Life Goes On
 Michael Hayes
 Misfits of Science
 Murder She Wrote
 My Family and Other Animals
 North of 60
 Nowhere Man
 Relic Hunter
 A Respectable Trade
 RoboCop: The Series
 Rumpole of the Bailey
 The Scarlet Pimpernel
 The Sopranos
 Starman
 Twin Peaks
 Water Rats
 Wiseguy

Gameshow
 Blockbusters
 The Crystal Maze
 Full Metal Challenge
 Give Us a Clue
 Jeopardy!
 Legends of the Hidden Temple
 Terror Towers
 What Would You Do?

Magazine
 Arabesque
 Box Office America
 Cartooning with Blitz
 Cybernet
 Movies, Games and Videos

Soap
 The Bold and the Beautiful
 The Colbys
 Dallas
 Dynasty
 Falcon Crest
 Knots Landing
 Melrose Place
 Neighbours

Reality
 Candid Camera
 That's Incredible!
 World's Funniest Videos

Documentary
 Animal Families
 Animal Miracles
 Arrest & Trial
 Battlefront
 Behind the Scenes
 Destinations
 Dogs with Jobs
 Zero Hour
 Exotic Islands of the World
 Great Romances of the 20th Century
 The History of Warfare
 Hollywood Stuntmakers
 Land of Opportunities
 The Last Paradise
 Lights, Camera, Action!
 Ripley's Believe It or Not!
 The Scene
 Space Exploration
 Today in History
 Wild Ones
 World Quest
 Would You Believe It!!
 You Asked for It

Sports
 Guinness World Records Primetime
 Scrapheap Challenge

Lifestyle
 The Album Show
 Excentriks
 Healthy, Wealthy and Wise

Anthology
 Amazing Stories
 Fantasy Island

Cooking
 Chef Tell
 Graham Kerr's Kitchen
 Great Chefs of the World
 Yan Can Cook

Music
 The Big Music Show
 The Chart Show
 The Dubai Chart Show
 Gulf Indian Music Countdown
 Indie Top 10
 The UK Chart Show

News and Current Affairs
 Business Arabia
 Link with Business Channel

Educational
 Science and Technology

See also
 Dubai One
 Saudi TV Channel 2 - Saudi Arabia's publicly owned English channel which originally featured similar programming (despite poor scheduling and much heavier censorship editing) to Dubai Channel 33 before its own re-branding.

References

Television channels and stations established in 1977
Television channels and stations disestablished in 2004
Television stations in the United Arab Emirates
Mass media in Dubai